Košarkaški klub Borac Čačak, commonly referred to as KK Borac Čačak  or as Borac Mozzart due to sponsorship reasons, is a men's professional basketball club based in Čačak, Serbia. The club plays in the Adriatic League and the Basketball League of Serbia. Their home arena is the Borac Hall.

History

1945–1992
Borac was a member of the Yugoslav First Federal League since the 1952 season. Players that grew up in this club were Radmilo Mišović (top scorer player of first division in the seventies), Dragan Kićanović, Radivoj Živković, Željko Obradović, and many other players who have left a significant mark on the basketball area of European, Yugoslav and Serbian basketball. In the 1972–73 season, the club finished in fourth place in the Regular Season standings of the Yugoslav First Basketball League, which was considered a great success for club from small city in Yugoslavia back then. Also, in the following season, Borac participated in European FIBA Korać Cup. In the 1978–79 Yugoslav First Basketball League season, the club finished in fifth place and club's youth team won the national competition.

1992–2017
In the period of FR Yugoslavia, Borac was a regular participant of top-tier YUBA League. In 1992–93 season, the club made it to the semifinals of the Yugoslav Cup. Following the Montenegrin independence from state union, the club participated in the Basketball League of Serbia, top-tier national league competition and one below the regional ABA League. In the 2009–10 Basketball League of Serbia season, the club finished in first place of the regular season standings of the Basketball League of Serbia, but was eliminated later in the Super League, which consists of best ranked national league clubs and Serbian clubs that participated in the ABA League. In the 2015–16 Basketball League of Serbia and 2016–17 Basketball League of Serbia seasons, the club finished in second place of the regular season standings of the Basketball League of Serbia.

2017–present
Starting with the 2017–18 season, the club besides the national league played in the newly established regional ABA League Second Division, where they were first in regular season, but eventually eliminated in the Playoffs. In the 2017–18 Basketball League of Serbia, 2018–19 Basketball League of Serbia and 2019–20 Basketball League of Serbia season as well, the club was first in regular season standings of the Basketball League of Serbia. In 2019–20 season which was cut short due to COVID-19 pandemic, the club based on regular season standings of the 2019–20 ABA League Second Division, was promoted to the top-tier regional league.

Borac finished its debut appearance in the 2020–21 ABA League First Division in 11th place, with 8–18 record, led by head coach Marko Marinović. In the following season, Borac improved its overall record to 9–17, but was forced to play the relegation playoffs because of league regulations with the Serbian team, and the new champion of the ABA League Second Division – Zlatibor, which they won in best of three games format.

Sponsorship naming
Borac has had several denominations through the years due to its sponsorship:
Borac Reksprom: 1992–1993
Borac Mozzart Sport: 2013–2016
Borac Mozzart: 2022–present

Home arenas 

 Borac Hall Near Morava (1969–present)

Players

Current roster

Depth chart

Coaches

  Mioljub Denić (1951–1960)
  Aleksandar Stefanović (1967)
  Josip Sever (1967–1968)
  Aleksandar Stefanović (1968–1969)
  Radmilo Mišović (1969)
  Aleksandar Stefanović (1969–1970)
  Dragoljub Pljakić (1970–1971)
  Lazar Lečić (1972–1973)
  Slobodan Koprivica (1973–1974)
  Nikola Mišović (1975–1976)
  Slobodan Koprivica (1977–1978)
  Aleksandar Nikolić (1978–1980)
  Slobodan Koprivica (1981–1983)
  Maško Purić (1983)
  Nenad Trajković (1989–1990)
  Ratko Joksić (1990–1992)
  Vladimir Androić (1992–1993)
  Slobodan Janković (1994–1995)
  Milovan Stepandić (1998–2000)
  Dejan Mijatović (2000–2002)
  Raško Bojić (2002–2003)
  Milovan Stepandić (2005–2008)
  Raško Bojić (2008–2015)
  Aleksandar Bjelić (2015)
  Raško Bojić (2015–2018)
  Jovica Arsić (2018–2019)
  Marko Marinović (2019–2022)
  Dejan Mijatović (2022–present)

Hall of Famers and greatest players

Naismith Memorial Basketball Hall of Fame

FIBA Hall of Fame

FIBA Order of Merit recipients

FIBA's 50 Greatest Players

Season-by-season

Trophies and awards

Trophies
Yugoslav Federal B League  (2nd-tier / defunct)
Winner (1): 1980–81
YUBA B League  (2nd-tier / defunct)
Winner (2): 1998–99, 2003–04
League Cup of Serbia (2nd-tier)
Winner (1): 2013–14

Awards 
 BLS First League MVP
  Nikola Ilić (1) – 2007–08
  Aleksa Avramović (1) – 2015–16

 BLS Super League MVP
  Nikola Ilić (1) – 2007–08

Yugoslav League Top Scorer
  Radmilo Mišović (5) – 1967–68, 1968–69, 1970–71, 1971–72, 1973–74

Notable players

1970s
  Goran Grbović
  Dragan Kićanović
  Radmilo Mišović
  Radivoj Živković
1980s
  Radisav Ćurčić
  Marko Ivanović
  Željko Obradović
1990s
  Igor Mihajlovski
  Haris Brkić
  Branko Milisavljević
  Oliver Popović
  Miroslav Radošević
2000s
  Branko Cvetković
  Zoran Erceg
  Dragan Labović
  Marko Marinović
  Aleksandar Rašić
  Duško Savanović
  Miloš Teodosić
  Nikola Ilić
  Branko Jorović
  Miroslav Raduljica
2010
  Aleksej Nešović
  Aleksa Avramović 
  Ilija Đoković
  Nemanja Protić
2020
  Lautaro López
  Duda Sanadze
  Sava Lešić
  Ivan Marinković
  Bryce Jones

International record

See also 
 KK Železničar Čačak
 KK Čačak 94
 KK Mladost Čačak

References

External links
  
 KK Borac Čačak at eurobasket.com

Borac Cacak
Basketball teams established in 1945
Sport in Čačak
Basketball teams in Yugoslavia